***, a series of three asterisks, may refer to:

 *** (novel), a 1994 novel by Michael Brodsky
 Dinkus, a row of 3 spaced asterisks (* * *) usually used to indicate a section break
 Asterism (typography) (⁂), three asterisks in a triangle, a variant of the dinkus
 Therefore sign (∴), three dots in a triangle

See also
 **** (four asterisks in a row), a common expurgation of any four-letter expletive
 Three star (disambiguation)